21mu Tiffin is a 2021 Gujarati drama film directed by Vijaygiri Bava, produced by Twinkle Vijaygiri under the banner Vijaygiri FilmOS. It is based on 21mu Tiffin, a short story by Raam Mori. The film is about a woman running tiffin service business. It was released on 10 December 2021.

Plot 
A woman running a tiffin service business meets her 21st tiffin customer and how it changes everything. She overcomes her obstacles despite her struggles.

Cast 
 Niilam Paanchal as Neetu ni Mummy
 Raunaq Kamdar as Dhruv
 Netri Trivedi as Neetal

Production 
The film is directed and scripted by Vijaygiri Bava. It is produced by Twinkle Vijaygiri under the banner Vijaygiri FilmOs and Hiren Gosai under the banner of H & H Movies. It is an adaptation of 21mu Tiffin, a story from Sahitya Akademi award winner short story collection Mahotu by Raam Mori.

Soundtrack
"Raah Jue Shangar Adhuro", sung by Mahalakshmi Iyer and composed by Mehul Surti, was released on 12 November 2021 on YouTube and received positively by the audience.

Release 
The trailer was released on 1 December 2021 on YouTube. The film was released on 10 December 2021.

Reception 
Sonal Pandya of Cinestaan rated it 3 out of 5. She praised theme of gender bias and patriarchy, comparing it to 2021 Malayalam film The Great Indian Kitchen. She also praised story, direction, performances and music. Nirali Kalani writing for Mid-Day praised the script, acting, dialogues and message of the film. Niraj Solanki, a social media reviewer, has said this film a Magnum Opus and praised it in all cinematic aspects.

Accolades 
The film was selected for the Toronto International Women Film Festival 2021. It was declared a winner at the WRPN Women's International Film Festival 2021. It was selected and screened at the 16th Tasveer South Asian Film Festival in September 2021. It was also selected and screened at the 52nd International Film Festival of India under Indian Panorama Selections in November 2021. It also competed for ICFT UNESCO Gandhi Medal there.

References

External links
 

2021 films
2020s Gujarati-language films
Films set in Ahmedabad
Films shot in Ahmedabad
Films shot in Gujarat
Indian drama films